Hesar Andaf (also Romanized as Ḩeşār Āndaf, Ḩeşārandaf, and Ḩeşār-e Āndaf; also known as Ḩeşār and Hisār) is a village in Hesar Rural District, Khabushan District, Faruj County, North Khorasan Province, Iran. At the 2006 census, its population was 487, in 141 families.

References 

Populated places in Faruj County